Vagotonia is the state of the autonomic nervous system in which the equilibrium between the sympathetic and parasympathetic nervous system is biased towards the parasympathetic, the opposite phenomenon being sympatheticotonia.
There is an associated clinical syndrome with low blood pressure (hypotension), low heart rate (bradycardia), miosis, often cold hands and feet, a cold and clammy diaphoresis, severe fatigue, and sometimes vasovagal syncope.

Description
The parasympathetic nervous system is dominant in situations of rest and relaxation, it has an activating effect on digestive organs and a relieving one on the heart. Endurance training supports vagotonia. For example, a low heart rate may be observed with sportsmen. With trained people vagotonia isn't regarded as abnormal, but rather as beneficial and protective in effect.

Parasympathetic nervous system